Songs for Oblivion Fishermen is a live album of the progressive rock group Caravan. The material was recorded for the BBC, spanning the years 1970 to 1974.

Track listing 

 Tracks 1 – 3 recorded for Top of the Pops 19.8.1970
 Tracks 4 – 6 recorded in session for Alan Black 11.3.1971, first transmitted 9.4.1971
 Tracks 7 – 8 recorded in session for John Peel 20.8.1973, first transmitted 30.8.1973
 Tracks 9 – 12 recorded in session for John Peel 7.2.1974, first transmitted 14.2.1974
 Tracks 1 – 8 are original mono recordings

Personnel 
Caravan
 Pye Hastings – guitar, vocals, liner notes
 Geoffrey Richardson – viola
 Dave Sinclair – keyboards, vocals
 Richard Sinclair – bass guitar, vocals (tracks 1–6)
 John G. Perry – bass guitar (tracks 7–12)
 Richard Coughlan – drums

Release information

References

External links 

 
 Caravan - Songs for Oblivion Fishermen album review by Jim Powers, credits & releases at AllMusic.com
 Caravan - Songs for Oblivion Fishermen album releases & credits at Discogs.com

Caravan (band) live albums
1998 live albums